Chris Talakai (born in Australia) is an Australian rugby union player for French club Bayonne. His position is prop. Talakai previously played Super Rugby for the New South Wales Waratahs.

Reference list

External links
Rugby.com.au profile
itsrugby.co.uk profile

Australian rugby union players
1994 births
Living people
Rugby union props
Sydney Stars players
New South Wales Country Eagles players
New South Wales Waratahs players
Aviron Bayonnais players